Run the World may refer to:

 Run the World (TV series), an American comedy series
 "Run the World (Girls)", a song by Beyoncé, 2011
 "Run the World", a song by Jennifer Lopez from Love?, 2011
 Run the World Tour, a 2017 concert tour by Run the Jewels